Vivo X80 is a line of Android-based smartphones developed and manufactured by Vivo. It features a Zeiss co-engineered imaging system.

Notes

References 

Android (operating system) devices
Vivo smartphones
Mobile phones introduced in 2022